The Canton of Bastia-6 (Furiani-Montésoro) is a former canton of the arrondissement of Bastia, in the Haute-Corse department, France. It had 14,541 inhabitants (2012). It was disbanded following the French canton reorganisation which came into effect in March 2015.

The canton comprised the following communes:
Bastia (partly)
Furiani

References

Bastia-6
Canton 6
2015 disestablishments in France
States and territories disestablished in 2015